In Austrian politics, the Federal Ministry of Agriculture, Regions and Tourism (German: Bundesministerium für Landwirtschaft, Regionen und Tourismus or BMLRT, although often called Nachhaltigkeitsministerium)
is the ministry in charge of agricultural policy, forestry, hunting, fishing, viticulture and wine law, postal and telecommunications services, mining, animal welfare, and the tourism industry.
The Ministry was first created in 2000 through a merger of the Ministry of Agriculture (Landwirtschaftsministerium) and the Ministry of Environment (Umweltministerium); it gained responsibility for the energy sector, mining, and tourism under the first Kurz cabinet in 2018.

The current Minister of Agriculture, Regions and Tourism is Elisabeth Köstinger.

History 

The Ministry's earliest precursor was the Cisleithanian Ministry of Agriculture (Ackerbauministerium), created in 1867. In additional to agriculture, the Ministry was responsible for regulating hunting, fishing, and hydraulic engineering, excluding hydraulic engineering of military importance.
The organization was renamed to Ministry of Agriculture and Forestry (Ministerium für Land- und Forstwirtschaft) in 1918 and was briefly called a department (Staatsamt) rather than a ministry during the two periods of constitutional transition following the two World Wars. Except for the name, however, the Ministry survived mostly in its original form until 2000.

In 1972, Austria established the Ministry of Health and the Environment (Ministerium für Gesundheit und Umweltschutz, usually called Gesundheitsministerium or Umweltministerium for short). In 1987, family affairs were added to its portfolio, turning it into the Ministry of Environment, Youth and Family Affairs (Ministerium für Umwelt, Jugend und Familie) 

In 2000, the two ministries were combined to form the Ministry of Agriculture, Forestry, Environment and Water Management (Ministerium für Land- und Forstwirtschaft, Umwelt und Wasserwirtschaft, although often called Lebensministerium). Responsibility for family affairs was moved to the Ministry of Social Affairs (Sozialministerium) at the time.

When the first Kurz cabinet took office in December 2017, the ministry was put in charge of the energy sector, mining, and tourism in addition to its existing powers and duties; it also gained its current designation.
The additional responsibilities created an institution with exceptionally broad authority; the new ministry has been described as a "super ministry" (Superministerium)  and a "behemoth" (Riese); the cabinet had difficulties finding a new name that would adequately reflect its extensive purview, the present minister has noted.
The move was not completely uncontroversial.

After the Second Kurz government took office in January 2020, the ministry was renamed Federal Ministry of Agriculture, Regions and Tourism.

Responsibilities 

As of January 2020, the Ministry is charged with regulating, supervising, or managing, respectively:
 agricultural policy and law;
 alternative service to military service: Zivildienst also called Regionaldienst (German for "regional service")
 the food sector with the exception of food safety;
 forestry policy and law;
 domestic markets for agricultural, food and forestry products, including seeds and seed stock, animal food, fertilizer, plant protection products, including their regulatory approval, with the exception of price regulation, surveillance, and control;
 imports and exports;
 wine law and viticultural supervision;
 land reform; agricultural authorities; agricultural and forestry real estate transactions; 
 measures aimed at reducing the agriculture and forestry sector's exposure to debt;
 water law and water management with the exception of the engineering aspects of waterway, water supply, and sewerage construction;
 plant protection;
 agricultural and forestry schools, including human resources management, to the extent not handles by the Chancellery;
 agricultural and forestry commodity exchanges;
 professional representation of agricultural and forestry entrepreneurs and freelancers;
 management of public real estate used for agriculture and forestry;
 hunting and fishing;
 protecting Austria's border waters and safeguarding Austria's water rights and water management interests; engineering aspects of water construction in border waters, with the exception of the Danube, the March, and the Thaya downstream from Bernhardsthal;
 mining;
 postal and telecommunications services;
 voluntary service;
 tourism.

Structure 

Since January 2020, the ministry consists of the Minister and her personal staff (Kabinett), the office of the general secretary, a special coordination department, and five numbered regular departments (Sektionen):
 Water management and hydraulic engineering (Wasserwirtschaft)
 Agriculture and rural development (Landwirtschaft und ländliche Entwicklung)
 Forestry and Sustainability (Forstwirtschaft und Nachhaltigkeit)
 Telecommunications and postal service and mining (Telekommunikation, Post und Bergbau)
 Tourism and regional policy (Tourismus und Regionalpolitik)

The Minister and her staff are political appointees; the general secretary and the section heads are career civil servants.

Ministers

First Republic

Second Republic

References

External links 

 Official homepage 
 English version

Agriculture Regions and Tourism
Austria
Austria
Austria
Austria
Lists of government ministers of Austria
Agricultural organisations based in Austria